Suhas Lalinakere Yathiraj (born 2 July 1983) is an Arjuna awardee Indian professional Para-Badminton player currently ranked world No.2 in men's singles and silver medalist in SL-4 category in Tokyo Paralympics 2021. Suhas is also an IAS officer of the 2007 batch of Uttar Pradesh cadre, he is presently serving as District Magistrate of Gautam Buddha Nagar. He has also served as the District Magistrate of Prayagraj. He became National Champion after winning gold medal in Men's Singles category at second National Para Badminton Championships held at Varanasi in March 2018. He is also an engineer who graduated from National Institute of Technology. He is the only IAS officer in India to win a Paralympic medal and an Arjuna Award.

At the 2016 Asian Para Badminton Championships, Beijing, China, he became the first Indian bureaucrat to win a professional International Badminton Championship. He won gold beating Hary Susanto of Indonesia in the finals when he was serving as District Magistrate of Azamgarh. He came to International attention when he won gold and became first ever serving Indian bureaucrat to represent and win a medal for India at global level.

In December, 2016, he became the recipient of  Uttar Pradesh's highest civilian honor, the Yash Bharti, which he received on 1 December 2016 from the erstwhile Chief Minister of Uttar Pradesh, Akhilesh Yadav. On 3 December, World Disabilities Day, he received award from the state government for his performances in para sports. He also holds distinctive record for winning many awards while serving in his official capacity. He has been awarded for his performances by Governor of Uttar Pradesh for his duties related to elections, by Revenue Minister and Chairman, Board of Revenue for duties regarding revenue administration. Suhas is also supported by GoSports Foundation through the Para Champions Programme.

Early life and education
Suhas Lalinakere Yathiraj was born to Yathiraj L K(late) and Jayashree C S in Hassan, Karnataka. Sibling : Sharath L Y,
His early schooling happened in Dudda near Hassan district. Since his father was a government servant, he had to travel and move with father during his postings at different places. He did most of his secondary education in DVS independent college Shivamogga, Karnataka. He graduated from National Institute of Technology, Surathkal, Karnataka in Computer Science and Engineering branch in 2004 by scoring First class with Distinction.

Posts held

Personal life
Suhas is married to Ritu Suhas, who got selected as Mrs U.P in Mrs. India 2019 contest a PCS officer currently posted as ADM (Administration) in Ghaziabad. His daughter Saanvi is 5 years old and son Vivaan is 2 years old. His wife has also been awarded for excellent work in voter awareness in general elections.

Achievements

Paralympic Games 
Men's singles SL4

Asian Championships 
Men's singles

Awards and recognition

In sports
 Awarded Arjuna Award (2nd Highest Sport Award after Khel Ratna) (2021)
 Yash Bharti, highest civilian honour of UP. (2016)
 Best Para Sportsperson, by State government of Uttar Pradesh on World Disability Day on 3 December 2016 in Lucknow
 Memento felicitation by president BAI (Badminton Association of India) during PBL (Premier Badminton League) in Lucknow on 6 January 2017
 On the occasion of National Sports Day, 2017 (August, 29th, 2017), he was given special award by Hon'ble Chief Minister, UP for winning International Medals for the Country and also received cash prize of 10 Lac rupees and appreciation certificate.

In administration
 Shortlisted for Prime Minister's award for excellent performance in Pradhan Mantri Jan Dhan Award
 Developed Mobile Application for Kuposhan ka Darpan and Pregnancy ka Darpan, to help undernourished children and pregnant mothers
 Developed Mobile Application for helping differently abled voters during general elections
 Awarded by Revenue minister, Government of UP and Chairman Board of Revenue for excellent work in administration
 Awarded by Hon’ble Governor UP for good performance in election related work
 During his tenure as the District Magistrate, Azamgarh, he also got shortlisted for Prime Minister's award for exemplary work in PM Jan Dhan Yojna on civil services day, 2016

References

External links
 Suhas Lalinakere Yathiraj at tournamentsoftware.com

1983 births
Living people
Indian Administrative Service officers
Indian male badminton players
Indian male para-badminton players
Paralympic badminton players of India
Badminton players at the 2020 Summer Paralympics
Paralympic medalists in badminton
Medalists at the 2020 Summer Paralympics
Paralympic silver medalists for India
Recipients of the Arjuna Award